Cansu Köksal (born 28 April 1994) is a Turkish basketball player. The  national plays small forward. Currently, she is a member of Beşiktaş.

See also
Turkish women in sports

References

External links
Profile at tbf.org.tr

1994 births
Fenerbahçe women's basketball players
Living people
Galatasaray S.K. (women's basketball) players
Hatay Büyükşehir Belediyesi (women's basketball) players
Small forwards
Basketball players from Istanbul
Turkish women's basketball players